José Miguel Alberto Durana Semir (born 27 June 1960) is a Chilean politician who currently serves as a member of the Senate of Chile.

References

External links
 
 BCN Profile

1960 births
Living people
University of Tarapacá alumni
Independent Democratic Union politicians
Senators of the LV Legislative Period of the National Congress of Chile
Senators of the LVI Legislative Period of the National Congress of Chile